Caprellidira is a parvorder of marine crustaceans of the infraorder Corophiida. The group includes skeleton shrimps (Caprellidae) and whale lice (Cyamidae).

Fifteen families are currently recognised in the group. They are grouped into seven superfamilies.

Superfamily Aetiopedesoidea Myers & Lowry, 2003
Aetiopedesidae Myers & Lowry, 2003
Paragammaropsidae Myers & Lowry, 2003
Superfamily Caprelloidea Leach, 1814
Caprellidae Leach, 1814 - Skeleton shrimps
Caprogammaridae Kudrjaschov & Vassilenko, 1966
Cyamidae Rafinesque, 1815 - Whale lice
Dulichiidae Laubitz, 1983
Podoceridae Leach, 1814
Superfamily Isaeoidea Dana, 1853
Isaeidae Dana, 1853
Superfamily Microprotopoidea Myers & Lowry, 2003
Australomicroprotopidae Myers, Lowry & Billingham, 2016
Microprotopidae Myers & Lowry, 2003
Superfamily Neomegamphopoidea Myers, 1981
Neomegamphopidae Myers, 1981
Priscomilitariidae Hirayama, 1988
Superfamily Photoidea Boeck, 1871
Ischyroceridae Stebbing, 1899
Kamakidae Myers & Lowry, 2003
Photidae Boeck, 1871
Superfamily Rakirooidea Myers & Lowry, 2003
Rakiroidae Myers & Lowry, 2003

References

External links

Corophiidea